The 2017 Alsco 300 was the 16th stock car race of the 2017 NASCAR Xfinity Series season and the 17th iteration of the event. The race was held on Friday, July 7, 2017, Sparta, Kentucky, at Kentucky Speedway, a 1.5 miles (2.4 km) permanent tri-oval racetrack. Due to inclement weather, the remainder of the race was held on Saturday, July 8. The race took the scheduled 200 laps to complete. At race's end, Kyle Busch, driving for Joe Gibbs Racing, scored his 88th career win in the xfinity series. He would hold off Ryan Blaney and Erik Jones for the win.

Background 

The race was held at Kentucky Speedway, which is a  tri-oval speedway in Sparta, Kentucky, which has hosted ARCA, NASCAR and Indy Racing League racing annually since it opened in 2000. The track is currently owned and operated by Speedway Motorsports, Inc. Before 2008 Jerry Carroll, along with four other investors, were the majority owners of Kentucky Speedway. Depending on layout and configuration the track facility has a grandstand capacity of 107,000.

Entry list 

 (R) denotes rookie driver.
 (i) denotes driver who is ineligible for series driver points.

Practice 
Practice was held on Thursday, July 6, at 2:00 PM EST. The session would last for 55 minutes.

Qualifying 
Second and final practice was cancelled due to inclement weather. Qualifying was held on Friday, July 7, at 4:30 PM EST. Since Kentucky Speedway is under  in length, the qualifying system was a multi-car system that included three rounds. The first round was 15 minutes, where every driver would be able to set a lap within the 15 minutes. Then, the second round would consist of the fastest 24 cars in Round 1, and drivers would have 10 minutes to set a lap. Round 3 consisted of the fastest 12 drivers from Round 2, and the drivers would have 5 minutes to set a time. Whoever was fastest in Round 3 would win the pole.

Morgan Shepherd, Quin Houff, and Brandon Brown would fail to qualify.

Full qualifying results

Race results 
Stage 1 Laps: 45

Stage 2 Laps: 45

Stage 3 Laps: 110

Standings after the race 

Drivers' Championship standings

Note: Only the first 12 positions are included for the driver standings.

References 

2017 NASCAR Xfinity Series
NASCAR races at Daytona International Speedway
July 2017 sports events in the United States
2017 in sports in Florida